Schnitzel is a boneless meat dish.

Schnitzel may also refer to:
 Schnitzel (film), Israeli short film
 Shnitzel (also spelled Schnitzel), a character in Chowder (TV series)